Leakey is a surname. Notable people with the name include:

People

Bob Leakey (1914–2013), inventor, potholer and cave diver
Caroline Leakey (1827–1881), English writer
Colin Leakey (born 1933), English botanist
David Leakey (born 1952), British Army general
James Leakey (1775–1866), English landscape and portrait painter
Joshua Leakey (born c. 1988), British recipient of the Victoria Cross
Louis Leakey (1903–1972), Kenyan archaeologist and naturalist
Louise Leakey (born 1972), Kenyan paleontologist
Mary Leakey (1913–1996), British paleoanthropologist
Meave Leakey (born 1942), British paleontologist
Nigel Gray Leakey (1913–1941), Kenyan recipient of the Victoria Cross
Phil Leakey (1908–1992), British make-up artist
Philip Leakey (born 1949), Kenyan politician
Rea Leakey (1915–1999), British Army major-general
Richard Leakey (1944–2022), Kenyan paleontologist, archaeologist and conservationist

Fictional characters
Mr. Leakey, a magician in J. B. S. Haldane's 1937 children's book My Friend Mr Leakey